Michel Souamas (born 26 February 1975) is a Gabonese former professional footballer who played as a goalkeeper.

During his career, Souamas played for Petrosport (1994–2002), US Bitam (2002–03), Tout Puissant Akwembe (2003–04) and FC 105 Libreville (2006–07), retiring in 2007.

He was a Gabonese international on five occasions, from 1997–2000, and appeared – as third-choice – at the 2000 African Cup of Nations.

References

External links

1975 births
Living people
Gabonese footballers
Association football goalkeepers
Petrosport F.C. players
US Bitam players
FC 105 Libreville players
Gabon international footballers
2000 African Cup of Nations players
21st-century Gabonese people